Positiv is an American Christian television network owned and operated by the Trinity Broadcasting Network. It mainly consists of a lineup of Christian films, varying between smaller independent studio productions and major Hollywood studio productions, as well as some secular, family-friendly films from major film studios.

Positiv is carried over-the-air on digital subchannels of TBN owned-and-operated and affiliated stations nationwide, usually on that station's fifth subchannel. Positiv is also available on pay television providers as well as on select digital streaming platforms like Apple TV, Roku, and Amazon Fire TV that offer TBN's six U.S. networks.  Positiv is also available worldwide, like in Australia on FaithStream TV.

History 

Positiv launched on January 26, 2020, replacing JUCE TV in its channel allotments.

References

External links

English-language television stations in the United States
Television channels and stations established in 2020